Sandra McDonald is an American science fiction and fantasy author.

She is a graduate of Ithaca College, and earned a Master of Fine Arts degree in creative writing from the University of Southern Maine.  She also spent eight years as an officer in the United States Navy, during which time she lived in Guam, Newfoundland, England, and the United States.  She has also worked as a Hollywood assistant, a software instructor, and an English composition teacher.  She teaches college composition 1 and 2 at Kaplan University online.  She attended the Viable Paradise writers' workshop.

Her short story "The Ghost Girls of Rumney Mill" was shortlisted for the James Tiptree, Jr. Award in 2003.  Her first novel, The Outback Stars, was published in April, 2007, and was followed by two sequels: The Stars Down Under (2008) and The Stars Blue Yonder (2009).

Her short story collection Diana Comet and Other Improbable Stories won the Lambda Award for LGBT SF, Fantasy and Horror works in 2011.

Originally from Revere, Massachusetts, she lives in Jacksonville, Florida.

Bibliography

Novels
 City of soldiers

The Outback Stars series
The Outback Stars (2007), Tor Books, 
The Stars Down Under (2008), Tor, 
The Stars Blue Yonder (2009), Tor,

Short fiction

Collections

Stories

References

External links

 Sandra McDonald's official website
 Author's page at Macmillan.com

Living people
21st-century American novelists
21st-century American women writers
American fantasy writers
American science fiction writers
American women novelists
American women short story writers
Asimov's Science Fiction people
Ithaca College alumni
Lambda Literary Award winners
People from Revere, Massachusetts
Female United States Navy officers
University of Southern Maine alumni
Women science fiction and fantasy writers
Year of birth missing (living people)
21st-century American short story writers
Military personnel from Massachusetts